Gariep Nature Reserve, also known as Gariep Dam Nature Reserve, and formerly known as Hendrik Verwoerd Dam Nature Reserve. It covers the entire northern shore of the Gariep Dam Area. The dam itself is situated in a gorge at the entrance to the Ruigte Valley, nearest town to the reserve is Norvalspont (about 5km away) behind the dam wall. The lake covers an area of 36.487 ha.

Wildlife 
Include: eland, kudu, gemsbok, blue wildebeest, red hartebeest, blesbok, impala, springbok, mountain reedbuck, klipspringer, steenbok and duiker.

Nature reserves in South Africa
Protected areas of the Free State (province)
Orange River